Super Dodge Ball is a sports video game developed and published by Technōs Japan that was for the Nintendo Entertainment System in 1989. It is loosely based on the 1987 arcade game of the same name, which was also developed by Technōs. Like its arcade counterpart, it was released in Japan as part of the Kunio-kun series.

In Japan, a PC port of the Famicom version of Nekketsu Kōkō Dodgeball Bu was released on October 17, 2003 as a budget-priced release. It was also included in the Game Boy Advance compilation Kunio-kun Nekketsu Collection 1, released in 2005. Both the Famicom version and the American NES version were released for the Wii, Nintendo 3DS and Wii U Virtual Console for their respective territories. The game was also released in Europe for the two latter systems, despite the NES version not being released in Europe.

Gameplay
The NES version of Super Dodge Ball expands upon the basic premise of the original arcade version by giving the members of each team individual names and stats. Moreover, in addition to the single-player tournament mode and a 2-player versus mode, there's also a free-for-all "bean ball" mode where the six members of Team USA fight each other until one remains.

The objective of each match is to defeat the rival team by throwing a dodge ball at its members. Each character has a life gauge that is gradually depleted as he gets struck by dodge balls. When their life reaches zero, they will be eliminated. When a character gets hit, with a life gauge of three bars or lower, they will be placed in a "tired" state, giving the opponent a moment of advantage. Moreover, each has their own stats and two different power shots (one which is performed while running, and another that is performed during a running jump).

World Cup play
World Cup play is the game's single-player mode. The player takes control of Team USA, as they compete against eight rival teams in a dodgeball tournament with irregular rules. To win each match, the player must defeat the three infield members of the rival team. However, if the three infield members of the player's team are defeated, the player will lose the match.

Like in the arcade version, the player starts off in a match against another rival American team and then proceed to face against seven international teams. The eighth match is against Team USSR. If the player loses at least one of their members during the match with USSR, the game will end after USSR is defeated. If all three infield members are still alive, an additional match set in Team USSR's home court will be held against Team Shadow, a clone of Team USA whose members will be arranged in the same positions as the player's.

The home courts of Team Iceland's and Team Kenya's are different from those of the other teams. Iceland's court is a slippery field of ice, whereas Kenya's court is a swampland that makes it hard to run.

Versus play
Versus play is the 2-player competitive mode. Both players can choose from any of the nine teams from the World Cup mode, including the same team as the other player. While both players can change the formation of their teams before each match, there's only one fixed court in this mode. The rules in each match are the same as in World Cup play.

Bean ball
Bean ball mode is a free-for-all mode that can be played by one or two players. The player can choose from one of the six members of Team USA. The members who are not chosen by the player (or players) will be controlled by the computer instead. In this mode, each member of Team USA must fight each other on a schoolyard until only one remains. Unlike the courts of the other game modes, there is no infield or outfield and all six characters can move in any place they want.

The background of the schoolyard changes depending on the difficulty setting: on Easy, it is set during the day; on Normal, it is evening; and on Difficult, it is nighttime.

Teams
Team USA
The team controlled by the player in World Cup play, as well as bean ball mode. Led by Sam Powers. The other members include John Stone, Mike Knopfler, Randy Sting, Bill Flash, and Steve Sato.
Team Pro All-Stars
The other American team, led by Jack, who is its most powerful member and holds the ball most of the time. Although their physical strength are low, they have good defense and can intercept many shots. Their stage is set atop a building with the Statue of Liberty on the background.
Team England
Led by James. A team with good shooting technique. Although they have high stamina, they become weak when stricken and their agility is not very high either. Their stage is set near the banks of River Thames with Tower Bridge on the background. Their theme music is loosely and mostly based on the song "Get Back" by the Beatles, with references to "I Want To Hold Your Hand" and "A Hard Day's Night".
Team India
Led by Rajiv. A team with low stamina, but unusually strong shots and extremely high resistance. They have no firm strategy and while they pass the ball to outfield members often, it is easier to steal their passes compared to other teams such as China. One of their players, Swami, is the most-resilient character in the game, as a super shot only causes him to lose 2 points of health. Their stage is set in front of Taj Mahal.
Team Iceland
Led by Helgi. While their stamina and ball power are high, their speed is slow. They're a team that relies on individual power play. They very rarely pass the ball to each other or crouch to avoid shots. Their stage is a field of ice with nobody but penguins on the background.
Team China
A team with low defense, but good catching technique. They attempt to distract the players by making good use of jumping passes to outfield teammates, as well as Captain Wang's power shot "The Breaker". Their stage is set on Tiananmen Square.
Team Kenya
Led by Yemi. They possess great speed and a wild agility. Their offensive and defensive strategies consist of using many dashes and jumps. They always shoot immediately when they possess the ball and rarely pass it to each other, and they'll try to steal the ball if the player is passing it to an outfield teammate. Their stage is set on an outdoor swampland at sunset. 
Team Japan
A team with great offense and leadership. Their captain Fuji always collects the ball and has powerful shots. Fuji is placed on the end row of the defensive side. However, its leadership falls apart when Fuji is eliminated. Their stage has Mount Fuji and a few cherry blossom trees on the background. Their theme music is based on "Sakura Sakura".
Team USSR
An all-around team with a balance in offense and defense, led by Boris. Their stage is set in front of Red Square. Their theme music is based on "Katyusha".
Team Shadow
A clone of Team USA, although their sprites are colored white-and-grey. They appear in the game after the match with Team USSR if the player wins the match with all of its members. Although they have the same formation and physical strength as the player's team during their match with USSR, the rest of their abilities are greater. The player's position cannot be changed before the match with Team Shadow. Their playing pattern is based on any of the eight previous CPU teams.

Regional differences

Like its arcade counterpart, the nationalities of the Japanese and American teams were switched between the two versions of the game. In the Famicom version, Team USA and Team Pro All-Stars were originally Nekketsu High School and Hanazono High School respectively, both Japanese teams. Team USSR is the penultimate team in the Famicom version and whereas their captain's sprite is unchanged, their stats are identical to Team Japan in the NES version. On the other hand, Team USA is the final rival team in the Famicom version and while their captain has the same design as Team Japan's captain in the NES version, their stats are the same as Team USSR's in the NES version.

Nekketsu Kōkō Dodgeball Bu was notably the first Famicom game to allow up to four players to participate simultaneously. The two additional players can participate in Bean Ball mode by plugging another controller or a multi-controller adapter such as HAL's Joypair and Hori's Twin Adapter into the console's expansion port. Since the NES Four Score and NES Satellite were not released yet when the game was made, the NES version only allows up to two players.

When the player resets the game in the Famicom version, a voice clip of Kunio saying his catch-phrase  will be played.

Notes

References

External links

 Director HP 
 AtariHQ: Super Dodge Ball instruction manual.
Super Dodge Ball video walkthrough and commentary

1988 video games
Dodgeball video games
Nintendo Entertainment System games
Kunio-kun
Epic/Sony Records games
Video games developed in Japan
Virtual Console games
Virtual Console games for Wii U
Multiplayer and single-player video games
Nintendo Switch Online games